The genus Nephrurus, collectively referred to as the knob-tailed geckos (or “knob-tails”), comprises several species of small, desert-dwelling, drought-tolerant Australian gecko. They are named for their stubby, knob-like tails, and are also easily identified by their rather large eyes. This  adaptation of enlarged eyes is indicative of an animal’s lifestyle being predominantly crepuscular or nocturnal.

Description
Lizards of this genus are easily distinguished by their short bodies, large heads, small legs, and short, carrot-shaped tails that often end in a small knob.

Species
The following 11 species are recognized as being valid.
Nephrurus amyae  – Centralian rough knob-tailed gecko
Nephrurus asper  – rough knob-tailed gecko
Nephrurus cinctus  – northern banded knob-tailed gecko
Nephrurus deleani  – Pernatty knob-tailed gecko
Nephrurus eromanga 
Nephrurus laevissimus  – smooth knob-tailed gecko
Nephrurus levis  - smooth knob-tailed gecko
Nephrurus levis levis  
Nephrurus levis occidentalis  
Nephrurus levis pilbarensis 
Nephrurus sheai  – Kimberley rough knob-tailed gecko
Nephrurus stellatus  – stellate knob-tailed gecko
Nephrurus vertebralis  – midline knob-tailed gecko
Nephrurus wheeleri  – banded knob-tailed gecko
The former Nephrurus milii , is now Underwoodisaurus milii  – barking gecko.

As pets
Some species are sold and captive bred as pets such as Nephrurus amyae, Nephrurus asper, Nephrurus cinctus, Nephrurus deleani, Nephrurus laevissimus, Nephrurus levis, Nephrurus vertebralis and Nephrurus wheeleri.

References

Further reading
Boulenger GA (1885). Catalogue of the Lizards in the British Museum (Natural History). Second Edition. Volume I. Geckonidæ ... London: Trustees of the British Museum. (Taylor and Francis, printers). xii + 436 pp. + Plates I-XXXII. (Genus Nephrurus, p. 9).
Günther A (1876). "Descriptions of new species of Reptiles from Australia". Journal des Museum Godeffroy 5 (12): 45–47. (Nephrurus, new genus, p. 46).

External links

AROD.com.au
Gekkota.com

Nephrurus
Lizard genera
Taxa named by Albert Günther
Geckos of Australia